Live at the Botanique – 9th-12th May, 2001 is a live album by Tindersticks. The album was the first in a series of 'official bootlegs', and was only available during the band's October 2001 tour.

Track listing 
"Trouble Every Day"
"El Diablo en el Ojo"
"A Night In"
"Buried Bones"
"Tiny Tears"
"If She's Torn"
"Can Our Love"
"People Keep Coming 'Round"
"I Know that Loving"
"Cfgf"

References

Tindersticks albums
2001 live albums